Muhamad Zamri Bin Chin (born on 22 May 1985) is a Malaysian footballer who is a striker.

External links
 Muhamad Zamri Chin's Profile at FAM's website

1985 births
Living people
Malaysian people of Malay descent
Malaysian footballers
Kedah Darul Aman F.C. players
Kuala Muda Naza F.C. players
Penang F.C. players
People from Kedah
Association football forwards